Idrinsky (masculine), Idrinskaya (feminine), or Idrinskoye (neuter) may refer to:
Idrinsky District, a district in Krasnoyarsk Krai, Russia
Idrinskoye, a rural locality (a selo) in Krasnoyarsk Krai, Russia